Ihor Reznichenko (born 30 December 1994) is a former Ukrainian figure skater who competed for Poland. He is the 2017 Slovenia Open champion and a three-time Polish national champion (2016, 2018, 2019). He has represented Poland at three World Championships and competed in the final segment at the 2018 European Championships.

Personal life 
Reznicheno was born on 30 December 1994 in Dnipro, Ukraine.

Career for Ukraine

Early years 
Reznichenko began learning to skate in 1999. He debuted on the ISU Junior Grand Prix series in September 2008, in Ostrava, Czech Republic. He also competed on the JGP series in 2009, 2011, and 2013.

He trained under Ludmyla Petrovska early in his career. By the 2009–2010 season, he was coached by Olena Ferafontova in Dnipro, Ukraine. By the 2011–2012 season, he was training in Kyiv under Halyna Kukhar and Olena Amosova.

2012–2013 season 
Reznichenko's senior international debut came at the NRW Trophy in December 2012. Later that month, he won the bronze medal at the Ukrainian Championships. Dmytro Shkidchenko and Halyna Kukhar coached him in Kyiv.

2013–2014 season 
Making his last international appearance for Ukraine, he placed 11th at the Winter Universiade, held in December 2013 in Trento, Italy. A week later, he took the silver medal at the Ukrainian Championships. He was coached by Shkidchenko.

Career for Poland

2015–2016 season 
In December 2015, Reznichenko won the Polish national title at the 2016 Four Nationals. He made no international appearances during the season.

2016–2017 season 
Reznichenko debuted internationally for Poland at the 2016 CS Ondrej Nepela Memorial, held in late September and early October 2016, and finished 9th. He placed 4th at the 2016 CS Warsaw Cup and then won the silver medal at the 2017 Polish Championships.

Reznichenko placed 25th at the 2017 European Championships in Ostrava, Czech Republic, just missing a spot in the final segment. He ranked 29th at the 2017 World Championships in Helsinki, Finland. He was coached by Evgeni Rukavicin and Galina Kashina in Saint Petersburg, Russia.

2017–2018 season 
In September 2017, Reznichenko won gold at the Slovenia Open. As a result, Poland assigned him to compete at the 2017 CS Nebelhorn Trophy, the final qualifying opportunity for the 2018 Winter Olympics. His placement in Germany, 11th, was insufficient to earn an Olympic spot.

Reznichenko qualified to the free skate at the 2018 European Championships in Moscow.

Programs

Competitive highlights 
CS: Challenger Series; JGP: Junior Grand Prix

For Poland

For Ukraine

References

External links 
 

1994 births
Polish male single skaters
Ukrainian male single skaters
Living people
Sportspeople from Dnipro
Naturalized citizens of Poland
Ukrainian emigrants to Poland
Competitors at the 2013 Winter Universiade